The 2012 European Individual Speedway Junior Championship was the 15th edition of the Championship.

Final
 25 August 2012
  Opole

See also 
 2012 Team Speedway Junior European Championship
 2012 Speedway European Championship

References 

2012
European Individual Junior